Eupithecia peckorum, or Peck's pug moth, is a moth in the family Geometridae. The species was first described by Roger L. Heitzman and Wilbur R. Enns in 1977. It is found in the United States in eastern Texas, Missouri, Mississippi and Louisiana.

The length of the forewings is 8.3-9.2 mm. The forewings are faintly reddish brown. The anterior portion is grayish, becoming brown posteriorly.

Etymology
The species is named in honor of araneologist Dr. and Mrs. William B. Peck of Central Missouri State University, Warrensburg.

References

Moths described in 1977
peckorum
Moths of North America